Daniel Evans was the defending champion, but he lost to Tobias Kamke in the first round.
Jan Hernych defeated 7–6(3), 6–4 her compatriot Jan Minář in the final.

Seeds

Draw

Finals

Top half

Bottom half

References
Main Draw
Qualifying Draw

The Jersey International - Singles
The Jersey International